is a video game produced by Konami. It is the second game in the Ganbare Goemon series (sometimes known in English as Mystical Ninja) and the first to be released on a video game console and home computer. It was initially released for the Family Computer July 30, 1986 and later released for the MSX2 a year later. The Famicom version was re-released in Japan only for the Game Boy Advance under the Famicom Mini label and for the Wii, Nintendo 3DS and Wii U under the Virtual Console service. A direct sequel, Ganbare Goemon 2, was released for the Famicom on January 4, 1989.

Gameplay
The game revolves around the main character, Goemon, and his exploits. As the name suggests, his character was based on Ishikawa Goemon, the noble thief of Japanese folklore. Unlike its sequels, this game still doesn't feature the comic situation and strange characters that define the series, and Goemon is portrayed as a noble thief rather than a plain hero.

The game plays as a top view action/adventure game (similar to The Legend of Zelda) though it is separated by stages. In each level Goemon must find three passes in order to advance. Some of these passes are found in boxes, secret passages or can be bought. After finishing all the stages, the game will present the player with a new Japanese province (eight in total), but all the levels will remain the same. The ending, however, will be different.

Like the rest of the series, Goemon can be powered-up if certain items are found and/or bought, which can be lost after a few hits.

The MSX version has the option to be played in turns by two players, with the second player playing as a ninja named Nezumi Kozō, which is the basis of Goemon's sidekick Ebisumaru. In addition, unlike the Family Computer version, the game has six more provinces with completely new levels after finishing the game once.

References

External links
Ganbare Goemon! Karakuri Dōchū at MobyGames
Ganbare Goemon 2 at MobyGames

1986 video games
Game Boy Advance games
Ganbare Goemon games
Japan-exclusive video games
MSX2 games
Nintendo Entertainment System games
Mobile games
Video games developed in Japan
Virtual Console games for Wii U

Single-player video games
Virtual Console games for Nintendo 3DS
Virtual Console games for Wii